Lango (or Langgo) is an Eastern Nilotic language spoken an estimated 38,000 people in South Sudan.

Classification 
Lango/Lokwa is listed as a member of the Eastern Nilotic branch of Nilotic, in the Eastern Sudanic sub-grouping of Nilo-Saharan. Within Eastern Nilotic, Lango/Lokwa is considered part of the Lotuko language group, in the Lotuko-Maa branch of Teso-Lotuko-Maa (also referred to as the non-Bari languages). Other members of the Lotuko language group include Lotuko, Lopit, Dongotono and Lokoya, all spoken in nearby regions of in South Sudan.

There has been virtually no description of the Lango language, and its relationship to other languages in the Lotuko cluster is unclear, as are the relationships between different dialects of Lango. Lokwa dialects is not listed in the Ethnologue. However, it is also noted that "It is uncertain whether or not the Lokwa dialect is separate language".

Geographic distribution 
The Lango language is spoken by the Lango people, who live in mountainous areas of Ikotos County in Eastern Equatoria State, South Sudan. According to the Ethnologue, the Lorwama variety is spoken in Losite payam, Lofos and Lotome; the Logir variety is spoken in Ikotos and Lomohidong payams, Kidepo and Ludwera; the Logire (Imatong) variety is spoken in Ikotos payam between Ikotos and Chukudum; the Lokwaa variety is spoken in Kikire and Ikotos, and the Ketebo variety is spoken in Losite payam, Bira.

Grammar 
Limited data is available on the Lango language, but Muratori (1938) notes that Lango lexical items appear to be more similar to Lokoya than Lotuko, but that Lango appears to be phonetically and grammatically more similar to Lotuko. It is likely that Lango shares many traits common to other languages in the Lotuko cluster and in Eastern Nilotic more generally, such as Verb-Subject-Object word order, two morphological verb classes, masculine and feminine grammatical gender for nouns, and a highly irregular number marking system involving a range of morphemes to mark singular, singulative, and plural. In terms of phonology, Lango is likely to have the Advanced Tongue Root contrast noted for closely related languages, and a consonant inventory including plosives at four or five places of articulation, with a voicing contrast at most of these.

Phonology

Example text 
In his 1938 grammar of the Lotuko language, Muratori includes a short fable for many of the languages related to Lotuko, including Lokwa/Lango. No direct translation is provided for the Lokwa/Lango story, but it is about a racing competition between a hyena and a frog.

References

Ethnologue

Agglutinative languages
Eastern Nilotic languages
Languages of South Sudan